Hot Country Songs is a chart that ranks the top-performing country music songs in the United States, published by Billboard magazine.  In 2007, 25 different songs topped the chart in 52 issues of the magazine, based on weekly airplay data from country music radio stations compiled by Nielsen Broadcast Data Systems.

In the first issue of the new year, Brad Paisley reached number one with "She's Everything", replacing "Want To" by Sugarland, which had been number one in the issue dated December 30, 2006.  This was the first of three number ones for Paisley in 2007, a feat only matched by Kenny Chesney.  Paisley, however, spent significantly less time at number one in 2007, occupying the top spot for five weeks compared to Chesney's twelve.  Chesney's song "Never Wanted Nothing More" was the longest-running number one of the year, with five weeks at the top.  Acts who achieved their first number ones in 2007 included Canadian band Emerson Drive, whose song "Moments", which topped the chart in June, was the first ever Hot Country Songs number one by a band from Canada. Big & Rich also reached number one for the first and only time, topping the chart with the wedding ballad "Lost in This Moment" in July.

In September, Garth Brooks made history when "More Than a Memory", the first single from his boxed set The Ultimate Hits, became the first song in the 63-year history of Billboard country music charts to enter at number one.  Another record was set in June when Tracy Lawrence topped the chart with his song "Find Out Who Your Friends Are".  Reaching number one in its 41st week on the chart, the song set a new record for the slowest climb to the top of the Hot Country Songs chart.  The final number one of the year was Taylor Swift's "Our Song", which also achieved a chart milestone.  With the song, which she had originally written for a high school talent show, 18-year old Swift became the youngest sole writer and singer of a number one country song.

Chart history

See also
2007 in music
List of artists who reached number one on the U.S. country chart

References

2007
United States Country Singles
2007 in American music